The Panmah Muztagh is a subrange of the Karakoram range, in Shigar, a district of Gilgit-Baltistan, Pakistan.

Geography 
Panmah Muztagh highest peaks are not particularly high by Karakoram standards, but they are exceedingly steep rock spires, unlike many of the peaks in the surrounding subranges. In particular, the highest of the Panmah peaks, Baintha Brakk (The Ogre) (7,285 m/23,901 feet), is a very difficult climb; it has seen only three ascents. The nearby Latok group is of similar difficulty.  Both groups lie on the north side of the long Biafo Glacier.

The Panmah Muztagh lies in the heart of the Karakoram, northwest of the Baltoro Muztagh (home of the eight thousand meter peaks of the Karakoram), and southeast of the Hispar Muztagh. On the southwest, it is separated from the Spantik-Sosbun Mountains by the Biafo Glacier. The Skamri Glacier and the Braldu Glacier separate it from the Wesm Mountains to the north. The Panmah, Nobande Sobande, Choktoi, and Chiring Glaciers lie within the range.

Notable peaks of the Panmah Muztagh

References

Mountain ranges of Gilgit-Baltistan
Baltistan
Mountain ranges of the Karakoram